A list of fantasy films released in the 2000s.

List

Notes

2000s
Lists of 2000s films by genre